Son Jun-ho (born March 28, 1983) is a South Korean singer and actor, best known in musical theatre. A classically-trained baritone, he made his debut in the 2009–2010 production of The Phantom of the Opera.

Career
Having majored in voice at Yonsei University, Son opted against a career in classical music and opera. At that time it was relatively unheard of for voice majors to immediately switch to musical theater and Son later stated that he had shocked his professors upon telling them that he had auditioned for a musical, although they did give him their full support. In 2009 he was double-cast in his first musical and was initially understudy to Hong Kwang-ho, playing Raoul in The Phantom of the Opera. 

Son gained wider recognition when he was cast as Aramis in the critically-acclaimed 2013 production of The Three Musketeers. The production received positive reviews and attracted foreign fans, leading to producers bringing it to Japan. For several years, Son limited his participation in musicals to devote more time to his young son and mostly performed in concerts or on Open Concert and Immortal Songs: Singing the Legend with his wife. In 2019 he garnered critical acclaim for his portrayal of Merlin in the South Korean premiere of Xcalibur and would return in the same role for its second run two years later.

Personal life
Son married musical actress Kim So-hyun in 2011 and they have a son (born in 2012). They first met in The Phantom of the Opera as she was cast as Christine Daaé. As working musical actors, they largely avoid starring as a married couple in the same production but made a rare exception for The Last Empress and Elisabeth.

Son returned to Yonsei to study for his master's degree. He graduated in 2022.

Filmography

Television series

Television show

Web shows

Radio shows

Musical theatre

References

External links

1983 births
Living people
South Korean male musical theatre actors
21st-century South Korean male actors
IHQ (company) artists
Yonsei University alumni